Snowtorch is the eighth studio album by American musician Phideaux Xavier. It was released March 21, 2011.

Track listing
All songs written by Phideaux Xavier, except "Celestine" by Mark Sherkus.

Personnel
 Phideaux Xavier - Acoustic Guitar, Piano, Vocals
 Ariel Farber - Vocals, Violin
 Valerie Gracious - Vocals
 Rich Hutchins - Drums
 Mathew Kennedy - Bass Guitar
 Gabriel Moffat - Electric Guitar
 Molly Ruttan - Vocals, Metal Percussion
 Linda Ruttan - Moldawsky - Vocals
 Mark Sherkus - Keyboards, Piano
 Jonny Unicorn - Keyboards, Saxophone, Vocals
 Stefanie Fife - Cello
 Chris Bleth - Flute, Soprano Saxophone

References

External links
 Snowtorch review on Prog Sphere

Phideaux Xavier albums
2011 albums